George J. Efstathiou, FAIA, RIBA is an American architect of Greek descent. George joined Skidmore, Owings and Merrill, LLP (SOM) in 1974, where he served as Managing Partner and later Consulting
Partner in the Chicago office until 2016. He is currently leading the consulting practice of Efstathiou Consulting LLC which serves clients in the architecture, planning, interiors design as well as others in the real estate and corporate communities.

As Managing Partner at SOM, George led numerous mixed-use projects throughout the world, including the United States, the United Kingdom, Brazil,
Canada, People's Republic of China, Hungary, Korea, Malaysia, Indonesia, Russia, Lebanon, Bahrain, Saudi Arabia, Qatar, Oman and the United Arab Emirates. George lectures frequently on projects, particularly the Burj Khalifa and served as Managing Partner and Chief Architect for the world's tallest building.

As much of his most noted work was focused in the Middle East in the later stages of his career, he was named one of the six most influential architects in Saudi Arabia by Middle East Economic Digest (MEED) 2010, Architect of the Year in 2011 by Middle East Architect Magazine and one of the top ten influential international architects in the Middle East by designMENA in 2015.

He was honored with Fellowship for the American Institute of Architects(FAIA) in 2009 which is given to the top few percent in the architecture profession in the US and is one of the few US architects holding a coveted membership in the Royal Institute of British Architects (RIBA).

When George’s career with Skidmore, Owings and Merrill, LLP began in 1974, his first 10 years with the firm focused primarily on domestic projects, including work in Boston, Los Angeles and Chicago. George began his international focus in 1985, when he was a part of the SOM team that designed a  Broadgate project over the air rights of the Liverpool Street Station in London. In order to follow through of the management and execution of the Broadgate project, in 1989 George relocated from Chicago to live and work in London for two years. During his time in London, he studied and gained a full understanding, knowledge and experience of the U.K. practice methods and techniques for the delivery of professional architectural services which, next to the U.S. techniques, are widely used around the world. It is here where George was able to obtain his licensure in the U.K.

In the Middle East he was responsible for projects such as Rolex Tower, Cayan Tower, Mashreq Bank Headquarters and Burj Khalifa all in Dubai, United Arab Emirates.

Education
 University of Illinois at Chicago, Bachelor of Architecture, 1974
 Lane Technical High School, 1969

Professional associations
 Registered Architect in Illinois, New York, Arizona, Colorado, Florida, Hawaii, Massachusetts, Missouri, New Mexico, Ohio, South Carolina, Texas and Virginia
 National Council of Architectural Registration Boards (NCARB)
 Architectural Registration Council of the United Kingdom
 Fellow, American Institute of Architects (AIA)
 Royal Institute of British Architects (RIBA)
 University of Illinois, Chicago, School of Architecture Advisory Board, Member
 Urban Land Institute, Member
 City Club of Chicago, Member
 Executive Club of Chicago, Member

Committees
 University of Illinois, Chicago, Ill.  (Present) College of Art & Architecture Visiting Committee. The board position was established to advise the College with particular emphasis on the School of Architecture.
 University of Illinois, Chicago, Ill. (2000–2005) School of Architecture Advisory Board. The board position was established to advise the School of Architecture.

Key projects
 Burj Khalifa
 Infinity Tower
 Rolex Tower
Mashreq Bank Headquarters
 Virginia Beach Convention Center, Virginia Beach, USA
 The Montgomery Residential Project, Chicago, Illinois
 BankBoston, São Paulo, Brazil
 Plaza Rakyat, Kuala Lumpur, Malaysia
 Symphony Center, Orchestra Hall Renovation, Chicago, Illinois
 Bahrain National Planning Development Strategy, Kingdom of Bahrain
 Burj Al Oula, Al Khobar, Saudi Arabia
 Korea World Trade Center, Seoul, Korea
 Virginia Beach Performing Arts Center, Virginia Beach, Virginia
 Virginia Beach 19th Street Corridor, Virginia Beach, USA
 United Airlines World Headquarters & Corporate Campus, Chicago, Illinois
 Metropolitan Financial Corporation, Cleveland, Ohio
 Russia Tower, Moscow, Russia
 Sonnenschein Nath & Rosenthal, St. Louis, Missouri & Washington D.C.
 Commonwealth Expansion, Chicago, Illinois
 USG Building, Chicago, Illinois
 Brompton Cross, London, United Kingdom
 Stockley Park Consortium, Ltd., Uxbridge, United Kingdom
 Ludgate Development, London, United Kingdom
 Broadgate Development, London, United Kingdom
 75 State Street, Boston, Massachusetts
 Kings Cross, London, United Kingdom
 Natural Gas Pipeline Company of America, Lombard, Illinois
 Citicorp Plaza, Los Angeles, California
 211 East Ohio Street, Chicago, Illinois
 Atrium One, Cincinnati, Ohio
 The Bay Club, Boston, Massachusetts
 60 State Street, Boston, Massachusetts
 Belgrade Tower, Belgrade, Serbia

See also
Skidmore, Owings & Merrill

References

External links 
 Official SOM Biography

20th-century American architects
Living people
Fellows of the American Institute of Architects
American people of Greek descent
University of Illinois Chicago alumni
21st-century American architects
Skidmore, Owings & Merrill people
Year of birth missing (living people)